The Nasdaq Riga, formerly Riga Stock Exchange, is the sole stock exchange operating in Riga, Latvia. It is owned by Nasdaq, which also operates exchanges in the USA, Denmark, Sweden, Finland, Iceland, Armenia, Lithuania, and Estonia. Established in 1993.

Riga Stock Exchange, together with Vilnius Stock Exchange and Tallinn Stock Exchange is part of the joint Baltic market that was established to minimize investing barriers between Latvian, Lithuanian and Estonian markets.

OMX Riga (OMXRGI) is an all-share index consisting of all the shares listed on the Riga Stock Exchange.

The exchange has a pre-market session from 08:30am to 10:00am, a normal trading session from 10:00am to 04:00pm, and a post-market session from 04:00pm to 04:30pm.

See also
List of stock exchanges
List of European stock exchanges
Nasdaq Copenhagen
Nasdaq Stockholm
Nasdaq Helsinki
Nasdaq Vilnius
Nasdaq Tallinn
Nasdaq Iceland

References

External links
 nasdaqbaltic.com Official site
 Nasdaq Baltic Market Indexes

Financial services companies established in 1993
Economy of Latvia
Stock exchanges in Europe
Nasdaq Nordic
Riga